Sri Lanka competed in the 2014 Commonwealth Games in Glasgow, Scotland from July 23 to August 3, 2014. Sri Lanka's team consists of 103 athletes in 13 sports. Nishantha Piyasena was appointed as the chef de mission of the team on June 29, 2014.

Competitors
The following is the list of number of competitors participating at the Games per sport/discipline.

Medalists

Athletics

Sri Lanka's athletics team consists of ten athletes.

Men

Field events

Women

Field events

* Did not race.

Badminton

Sri Lanka's badminton team consisted of nine athletes.

Individual

Doubles

Mixed team

Pool A

Quarterfinals

Boxing

Sri Lanka's boxing team consists of ten athletes.

Men

Women

Cycling

Sri Lanka's cycling team consists of four athletes.

Road

Gymnastics

5 gymnasts competed for Sri Lanka.

Artistic
Men

Women

Judo

Sri Lanka has entered three judokas.

Rugby sevens

Sri Lanka has qualified a rugby sevens team. The roster of 12 is:

Roster

 Dinusha Chathuranga
 Richard Dharmapala
 Shenal Dias
 Mithun Hapugoda
 Sandun Herath
 Fazil Marija
 Sudharshana Muthuthantri
 Shehan Pathirana
 Lavanga Perera
 Danuska Ranjan
 Srinath Sooriyabandara
 Anuruddha Wilwara

Pool D

Bowl

Shield
Semifinals

Final

Finished in 13th place

Shooting

Sri Lanka's shooting team consists of six male and five female athletes.
Men

Women

Squash

Sri Lanka's squash team consists of six athletes.
Individual

Doubles

Swimming

Sri Lanka's swimming team consists of five athletes.

Men

Women

Table tennis

Sri Lanka's table tennis team consists of eight athletes.

Individual

Doubles

Team

Weightlifting

Sri Lanka's weightlifting team consists of nine athletes.

Men

Women

Powerlifting
Men

Wrestling

Sri Lanka's wrestling team consists of seven athletes.

Men's freestyle

References

Nations at the 2014 Commonwealth Games
Sri Lanka at the Commonwealth Games
2014 in Sri Lankan sport